For lists of 2021 albums, see:

 List of 2021 albums (January–June)
 List of 2021 albums (July–December)